Beat Surf Fun is the third studio album from the indiepop band Tullycraft. The entire album was recorded on analog tape at a practice space the band rented in Ballard, WA. It is the first record the band released on the Portland-based Magic Marker Records. The album included the single "Wild Bikini" and the international indie pop hit "Twee." Beat Surf Fun also marks the first appearance of vocalist, Jenny Mears, who would eventually join Tullycraft. The design of the CD back card can be confusing since it lists the title of the album on the sides as "Fun Beat Surf" and "Surf Beat Fun" respectively.

Track listing
All tracks by Tullycraft except where noted.

 "Twee" – 3:23 
 "Glitter & Twang" – 4:09 
 "Christine, ND" (Six Cents and Natalie) – 3:18
 "Wild Bikini" – 2:34 
 "DIY Queen" – 4:19
 "Cowgirls On Parade" – 3:12
 "I Kept The Beach Boys" – 2:27
 "Orange Cake Mix" – 1:50 
 "Knockout" (Benji Cossa) – 1:55
 "Radio Theme" – 0:46 
 "Sent To The Moon" – 4:17
 "Who Needs What" (Jim Guthrie) – 3:15

Personnel
Tullycraft
 Sean Tollefson – vocals, bass, keyboard
 Jeff Fell – drums, guitar
 Chris Munford – guitar, keyboard, backing vocals | recording, audio engineering
 Jenny Mears – vocals, backing vocals
 Harold Hollingsworth – lead guitar

Additional
 Gabriel Stewart – viola on "I Kept The Beach Boys"

References 

 Strong, M. C. (2003). The Great Indie Discography (2nd Edition) pg. 1041. Published by Canon Books Ltd. (US/CAN) .

2002 albums
Tullycraft albums